Myron Sibbie McNeil (September 28, 1873 - buried October 1, 1944) was a Democratic Mississippi State Senator, representing the 11th District, from 1904 to 1908.

Early life and education 
Myron Sibbie McNeil was born on September 28, 1873, in Crystal Springs, Mississippi. He was the son of Jarrot Wesley McNeil and Lucy (Bob) McNeil. His ancestors came from Scotland. He was educated in Crystal Springs elementary schools. He received a B. S. from Lexington Normal College. He also graduated from the Millsaps College law school, where he received a Bachelor of Laws degree.

Career 
He was admitted to the bar in 1898 and began practicing law thereafter. He was nominated to represent the 11th district, composed of Copiah County, as a Democrat, in the Mississippi State Senate in August 1903 for the 1904–08 term, and was elected in November 1903. Afterwards, he continued practicing law as an attorney in Hazlehurst. He died of a heart attack in September 1844, and he was buried in Hazlehurst on October 1, 1944.

Personal life 
McNeil was a Methodist. On July 6, 1904, he married Deborah Martin. They had at least 1 child together, a daughter, who survived Deborah when she died in 1949.

References 

1873 births
1944 deaths
Democratic Party Mississippi state senators
People from Crystal Springs, Mississippi
Mississippi lawyers
Millsaps College alumni